"Who Do You Love?"  is a song by American hip hop recording artist YG from his debut studio album My Krazy Life (2014). It was released on February 20, 2014, as the third single from the album. The song, produced by frequent collaborator DJ Mustard, features a guest appearance from Canadian rapper Drake. The song has since peaked at number 54 on the US Billboard Hot 100 chart.

Background
YG has stated that the inspiration of the song came from a Lil Boosie song of the same name. The song was originally intended as the first single off of "My Krazy Life" but YG chose to go against the label due to him preferring to not rely on Drake for success. The song initially leaked New Year's Eve 2013 after a fan impersonating a DJ tricked YG into emailing him the song.

Chart performance
Who Do You Love? debuted at number 78 on the US Billboard Hot 100, on the chart dated March 29, 2014. The following week on the chart, the song reached its peak position at 54 on the chart. On May 31, 2018, the single was certified double platinum by the Recording Industry Association of America (RIAA) for combined sales and streaming data units of over two million units in the United States.

Controversy
On December 30, 2013, San Francisco rapper Rappin' 4-Tay wrote a tweet saying that Drake's verse on the song copied his verse from his 1994 single "Playaz Club".

Music video
A music video for "Who Do You Love?" was released via YG's VEVO channel on March 7, 2014. It was directed by Benny Boom.

Charts

Weekly charts

Year-end charts

Certifications

References

2013 songs
2014 singles
YG (rapper) songs
Drake (musician) songs
Def Jam Recordings singles
Song recordings produced by Mustard (record producer)
Songs written by Drake (musician)
Songs written by Mustard (record producer)
Songs written by Booker T. Jones
Songs written by YG (rapper)
Songs written by William Bell (singer)